The Committee of Fifty met in New York City, United States, in October 1829.  They advocated redistribution of property between the poor and rich; as well as abolition of banking, monopoly, and debt imprisonment.

They also nominated a slate of Working Men's Party candidates for the upcoming elections.

See also
 Working Men's Party
 Communism
 Socialism
 Anarchism
 Industrial Revolution

References

Political organizations based in the United States
1829 in New York (state)
Defunct socialist parties in the United States